Kumler may refer to:

Daniel Kumler Flickinger (1824–1911), American Bishop of the Church of the United Brethren in Christ
Elias Kumler House, registered historic building in Oxford, Ohio
Henry Kumler, Sr. (1775–1854), bishop of the Church of the United Brethren in Christ in the USA
Kumler, Illinois, ghost town in West Township, McLean County, Illinois, USA
Rike Kumler Co., former American department store in Dayton, Ohio

vo:Kumler